| awards                  =
}}

Akhtar Jamal, is the founder and editor-in-chief of Pakistan Press Agency(PPA) and Tele-Visual Infolink. Akhtar Jamal is also a Special Correspondent of Bridges TV, USA and Channel News Asia (CNA-Singapore).

Akhtar Jamal also writes exclusively on regional affairs for Pakistan Observer newspaper and edits the weekly publication of Pakistan Observer's "Economy Watch".

Background
Akhtar Jamal is a senior journalist with more than two decades of professional experience. He has worked for Jang Group of Newspapers for over a decade and represented several international top news organisations and electronic media. Akhtar Jamal has also written several hundreds articles and analysis on regional situation and is specialised on Central Asian and Middle East strategic affairs.

Akhtar Jamal has travelled widely and attended dozens of Summit Meetings of different regional and international organisations including OIC, ECO, NATO, South Asian Association for Regional Cooperation etc. He also speaks more than six foreign languages and specialises in regional political and geo-strategic developments.

Pakistan Press Agency (PPA)
Pakistan Press Agency (PPA) was established in 1990 in Karachi by Akhtar Jamal (who served several reputed international news organizations for more than ten years in Ankara, Vienna and Beirut) as its Chief Executive and M. N. Deen, (who had retired as director of Press & Information Department, Government of Pakistan) as its managing editor. (Mr. Deen expired in 1998).

Initially PPA started its work with Jang Group of Newspapers for which Mr. Jamal had already worked for years.

On 30 April 1990, PPA established its Islamabad Bureau office which was inaugurated by Mr. Jamal and attended by the founder and the then Editor-in-Chief of Jang Group of Newspapers, Mir Khalil-ur-Rehman. The ceremony was attended by two other federal ministers and several prominent journalists, diplomats.

PPA gained popularity during Iraqi occupation of Kuwait and the 1991 First Gulf War due to massive coverage with its correspondents in Middle East particularly in Sydney, Melbourne, Ankara, Istanbul, Beirut, Tehran, Cairo and Baghdad.

More one hundred thousand stories of PPA have already been published during last one decade particularly in Karachi newspapers. Daily Dawn also published several PPA exclusive stories as its main lead.

Apart from more than a dozen Urdu newspapers, several English dailies, including Pakistan Observer (Islamabad), The News International (Karachi), Jang London, Frontier Post (Peshawar) and The Statesman published PPA stories.

In 1998, Pakistan Press Agency published its first book "Who is Who in Pakistan" edited by Akhtar Jamal.

PPA has two main offices in Pakistan, Islamabad and Karachi.

Tele-Visual Infolink (TVI)
Tele-Visual Infolink (TVI) was established by Mr. Akhtar Jamal, Founder and Editor-in-Chief of Pakistan Press Agency (PPA).

TVI serves as the only Pakistani visual agency supplying visual clips to dozens of local and foreign TV networks.
TVI has established its own visual clipping bank and provides important video clips to a number of news and information agencies around the world. In Pakistan TVI operates mainly from its Islamabad while it also maintains regional offices in all provincial capitals of Pakistan and Azad Kashmir.

TVI also offer special coverage of international or regional meetings, seminars, exhibitions and lectures on Pakistan and regional affairs.

In year 2007, TVI published the most comprehensive Book & CD on Pakistani websites entitled as "Web Guide to Pakistan".

In year 2009, TVI brought out one of the most unusual book on Media "PAKISTAN MEDIA & PR GUIDE". PAKISTAN MEDIA & PR GUIDE,

On 14 August 2009, TVI launched a website entitled as "ViewPakistan.com". The main objective to launch "View Pakistan" is to promote Pakistan as a worldwide destination and create awareness about Pakistani culture, heritage, lifestyle and tourism among locals and foreigners.

TVI also conducts surveys and polls to ascertain public opinion on National issues as well as current and regional issues.

Publications

"Who is Who" - Web Guide to Pakistan – Year 1998
"Web Guide to Pakistan" – Year 2007
"Pakistan Media & PR Guide" – Year 2009
"Pakistan Business Guide" – Year 2011 (estimated)

References

External links
 Tele-Visual Infolink
 Pakistan Observer

Pakistani male journalists
Living people
Year of birth missing (living people)